The HSM 190 - 193 were a class of four 1'B steam locomotives build by Borsig for the Hollandsche Spoorweg Maatschappij in 1888. The locomotives were named as was typical for the HSM. These were of the same type as locomotives of the series 184-189 (later the NS 1100 serie) with the exception that these locomotives were compounds. Compounding was introduced in an effort to improve efficiency.

In 1885, Mr. F.A.A. Middelberg of the HSM ordered a study of coal efficiency improvement by the use of compounding. Four locomotives of the series 184-189, two in freight service and two in passenger service, were converted. The trials were successful The four production machines showed a decrease in coal consumption as well. The reduction in coal usage was around 17%. Still, no further compound locomotives were built for the HSM.

Typically, compounding locomotives use a small-diameter high-pressure cylinder(s) and a large-diameter low-pressure cylinder(s). These locomotives were different: the cylinders had the same bore, but different strokes. The low pressure cylinder's stroke was double the length of the high pressure cylinder's. The cut-off of the cylinders could be independently controlled.

The HSM employed these locomotives from depots in Zutphen and Almelo. In 1908, three locomotives were taken out of service, whilst No. 191 Paulus Potter remained in service until 1913. All locomotives have been scrapped.

Fleet list

References

2-4-0 locomotives
Railway locomotives introduced in 1888
Steam locomotives of the Netherlands
Hollandsche IJzeren Spoorweg-Maatschappij
Borsig locomotives